Begemder (also known as Gondar or Gonder, alternative name borrowed from its 20th century capital Gondar) was a province in northwest Ethiopia.

Etymology
A plausible source for the name Bega is that the word means "dry" in the local language, while another possible interpretation could be "sheep," where rearing of sheep is beg in Amharic. Thus, Begemder likely refers to "land that rears sheep" or "the dry area." Another etymology is that the first two syllables come from the Ge'ez language baggi` for sheep (Amharic: beg medir) "Land of Sheep." Beckingham and Huntingford note that Begemder originally applied to the country east of Lake Tana, where water is scarce, and concluded, "The allusion to the lack of water suggests Amharic baga, "dry season," as a possible source of the name."

History
The earliest recorded mention of Begemder was on the Fra Mauro map, (c.1460), where it is described as a kingdom. While Emperor Lebna Dengel, in his letter to the King of Portugal (1526), also described Begemder as a kingdom, he included it as a subdivision of his empire. Kanfat in southern Begemder was briefly governed by Abubaker Qecchin of Adal in the sixteenth century. The Guzara royal castle; built by Emperor Minas in 1560 in Enfraz, Begemder ( east of Gonder) as a site of royal residence and camp a century before Emperor Fasilides founded and built the castles of Gondar. During the later 18th century, its capital was at Filakit Gereger, where Ras Ali died in 1788.

Begemder's boundaries were revised as a result of Proclamation 1943/1, which created 12 taklai ghizats from the existing 42 provinces of varying sizes. Begemder had an estimated population of 3 million in the 1984 cenus. With the adoption of the new constitution in 1995, Begemder was divided between two new ethnic regions. Northern Begemder became part of Tigray Region, while the remainder became part of the Amhara Region.

See also
History of Ethiopia
Subdivisions of Ethiopia
Gondar

References

States and territories established in 1942
States and territories disestablished in 1995
Amhara Region
Benishangul-Gumuz Region
Provinces of Ethiopia